The Lewis Hills is a section of the Long Range Mountains located on the west coast of Newfoundland, along the Gulf of Saint Lawrence.

An ophiolite and Peridotite complex, the Lewis Hills is the southernmost of four such complexes  located within the Humber Arm Allochthon, a world-renowned geological area.  It is located in an area stretching between the town of Stephenville in the south and the city of Corner Brook in the north.

The Lewis Hills is an excellent backcountry wilderness hiking destination. The most accessible day-hiking route to the Lewis Hills is by the International Appalachian Trail, with the southern trail head located almost at the end of Cold Brook Road, and the northern trail head at the end of Logger School Road

References 

Mountain ranges of Newfoundland and Labrador